One third of Reigate and Banstead Borough Council in Surrey, England is elected each year, followed by one year without election. Since the boundary changes in 2019, 45 councillors have been elected from 15 wards.

Political control
Since the first election to the council in 1973 political control of the council has been held by the following parties:

Leadership
The leaders of the council since 2003 have been:

Council elections
1973 Reigate and Banstead Borough Council election
1976 Reigate and Banstead Borough Council election
1979 Reigate and Banstead Borough Council election (New ward boundaries)
1980 Reigate and Banstead Borough Council election
1982 Reigate and Banstead Borough Council election
1983 Reigate and Banstead Borough Council election
1984 Reigate and Banstead Borough Council election
1986 Reigate and Banstead Borough Council election
1987 Reigate and Banstead Borough Council election
1988 Reigate and Banstead Borough Council election
1990 Reigate and Banstead Borough Council election
1991 Reigate and Banstead Borough Council election
1992 Reigate and Banstead Borough Council election
1994 Reigate and Banstead Borough Council election (Borough boundary changes took place but the number of seats remained the same)
1995 Reigate and Banstead Borough Council election
1996 Reigate and Banstead Borough Council election
1998 Reigate and Banstead Borough Council election
1999 Reigate and Banstead Borough Council election
2000 Reigate and Banstead Borough Council election (New ward boundaries)
2002 Reigate and Banstead Borough Council election
2003 Reigate and Banstead Borough Council election
2004 Reigate and Banstead Borough Council election
2006 Reigate and Banstead Borough Council election
2007 Reigate and Banstead Borough Council election
2008 Reigate and Banstead Borough Council election
2010 Reigate and Banstead Borough Council election
2011 Reigate and Banstead Borough Council election
2012 Reigate and Banstead Borough Council election
2014 Reigate and Banstead Borough Council election
2015 Reigate and Banstead Borough Council election
2016 Reigate and Banstead Borough Council election
2018 Reigate and Banstead Borough Council election
2019 Reigate and Banstead Borough Council election(New ward boundaries)
2021 Reigate and Banstead Borough Council election
2022 Reigate and Banstead Borough Council election

By-election results

2002-2006

2006-2010

2010-2014

2014-2018

References

 By-election results

External links
Reigate and Banstead Borough Council

 
Reigate and Banstead
Council elections in Surrey
District council elections in England